A partial lunar eclipse took place on Saturday, December 21, 1991, the last of four lunar eclipses in 1991. The moon grazed the northern edge of the umbral shadow.

Visibility 

This small partial eclipse was visible from North America, eastern Asia, Australia, and western South America.

Related eclipses

Eclipses of 1991 
 An annular solar eclipse on January 15.
 A penumbral lunar eclipse on January 30.
 A penumbral lunar eclipse on June 27.
 A total solar eclipse on July 11.
 A penumbral lunar eclipse on July 26.
 A partial lunar eclipse on December 21.

Lunar year series

Metonic cycles (19 years)

Half-Saros cycle
A lunar eclipse will be preceded and followed by solar eclipses by 9 years and 5.5 days (a half saros). This lunar eclipse is related to two partial solar eclipses of Solar Saros 122.

See also 
List of lunar eclipses
List of 20th-century lunar eclipses

References

External links 
 Saros cycle 115
 

1991-12
1991 in science
December 1991 events